

Company 

JuJuBe is a bag, wallet, purse and accessory company that was founded in 2005 by Joe Croft and Kristin Hunziker. The company creates highly-durable, functional bag for mothers. The company is based in Irvine, California. The brand specialises in manufacturing diaper bags, handbags, laptop bags and related accessories. The brand manufactures specially designed bags that are eco-friendly and helpful for parents with young kids.

Collaborations 
JuJuBe International has collaborated with these fellow brands, designers & companies:

TokiDoki, Sanrio, Hello Kitty, World of Warcraft, Blizzard, Harry Potter, Warner Brothers, Tula, Happy Planner

Awards 

 Juvenile Products Manufacturers Association (JPMA) "Innovation Awards Finalist" - 2019 
 What to Expect When You're Expecting "Mom Must-Have Award" - 2017
 Juvenile Products Manufacturers Association (JPMA) "Babylist Fresh Find Award" - 2017

Featured in Television

"I Feel Bad" - Season 1 - NBC - TV Series - Episode 5 
"Crazy Ex Girlfriend" - Season 4 - CW - TV Series -  Episode 2
"Ballers" - Season 4 - HBO Productions - Comedy/Drama/Sport - TV Series - Episode 1 
"The Quad" - Season 2 - B.E.T. - Drama - TV Series - Episode 10 
"The Quad" - Season 2 - B.E.T. - Drama - TV Series - Episode 9
"The Quad" - Season 2 - B.E.T. - Drama - TV Series - Episode 4
"The Quad" - Season 2 - B.E.T. - Drama - TV Series - Episode 2
"Grace and Frankie" - Season 4 - Netflix Studios - Comedy - TV Series - Episode 1

References

External links

Jujube Diaper Bags Malaysia

Bags (fashion)
American companies established in 2005